Elections to the Labour Party's Shadow Cabinet (more formally, its "Parliamentary Committee") occurred in November 1956. In addition to the 12 members elected, the Leader (Hugh Gaitskell), Deputy Leader (Jim Griffiths), Labour Chief Whip (Herbert Bowden), Labour Leader in the House of Lords (A. V. Alexander) were automatically members.

The results of the election are listed below:

† Multiple candidates tied for position.

References

1956
Labour Party Shadow Cabinet election